Hector and Ngakawau are two lightly populated settlements located at the mouth of the Ngakawau River in the West Coast region of New Zealand. Both settlements are situated on State Highway 67 between Westport and Karamea. Despite a low population, many of the workers at New Zealand's largest open-cut coal mine at Stockton choose to live at these places and shuttles frequently operate between the two places.

Hector
Hector sits on the northern side of the Ngakawau River's mouth, and is the more populous of the two settlements.

Hector has adopted the endangered Hector's dolphin as a town icon and is involved in Department of Conservation projects to protect the dolphin. The dolphins often play just offshore from Hector and attract visitors. Another local attraction is a country music museum.

Ngakawau
Ngakawau, the more economically important of the two settlements, stands on the southern side of the mouth of the Ngakawau River.

 Ngakawau serves as the terminus of the Ngakawau Branch railway. An aerial ropeway from the Stockton Mine transports significant tonnages of coal to Ngakawau for trans-shipment to the port town of Lyttelton on the east coast of New Zealand. The line from Westport to Ngakawau opened on 12 September 1877, and an extension northward across the river through Hector to Mokihinui opened on 8 August 1893. The line ultimately extended to Seddonville on 23 February 1895 and became known as the Seddonville Branch. Passenger services through both settlements were provided by mixed trains; they ceased to operate from 14 October 1946. Coal was almost the sole traffic from that stage, and as output from mines to the north declined, the line's maintenance costs outweighed revenue and the section north of Ngakawau closed.

Demographics

The population of Hector and Ngakawau was 201 in the 2018 New Zealand census, a decrease of 18 (-8.2%) since the 2013 census, and a decrease of 33 (-14.1%) since the 2006 census. There were 105 males and 96 females, giving a sex ratio of 1.09 males per female. Ethnicities were 180 people  (89.6%) European/Pākehā, 33 (16.4%) Māori, 3 (1.5%) Pacific peoples, and 3 (1.5%) other ethnicities (totals add to more than 100% since people could identify with multiple ethnicities). Of the total population, 18 people  (9.%) were under 15 years old, 18 (9.%) were 15–29, 111 (55.2%) were 30–64, and 60 (29.9%) were over 65.

Notes and references

Notes

References 

 

Buller District
Populated places in the West Coast, New Zealand